Lord Stevenson may refer to:

 James Stevenson, 1st Baron Stevenson (1873–1926), British businessman and civil servant
 Dennis Stevenson, Baron Stevenson of Coddenham (born 1945), British businessman
 Wilf Stevenson, Baron Stevenson of Balmacara (born 1947), British Labour life peer and former adviser